1428 Mombasa, provisional designation , is a dark asteroid from the middle region of the asteroid belt, approximately 56 kilometers in diameter.

It was discovered on 5 July 1937, by English-born South African astronomer Cyril Jackson at Johannesburg Observatory, South Africa, and later named after Mombasa, Kenya.

Orbit and classification 

Mombasa orbits the Sun at a distance of 2.4–3.2 AU once every 4 years and 9 months (1,720 days). Its orbit has an eccentricity of 0.14 and an inclination of 17° with respect to the ecliptic.

Physical characteristics

Rotation period 

American astronomer Robert Stephens obtained a rotational lightcurve of Mombasa in June 2012. Light-curve analysis gave a rotation period of 16.67 hours with a brightness variation of 0.16 magnitude. Previous lightcurves were obtained by French amateur astronomer René Roy in February 2006 (17.6 hours, Δ0.15 mag), as well as by Scot Hawkins and Richard Ditteon at Oakley Observatory in May 2007 (17.12 hours, Δ0.25 mag).

Spectral type, diameter and albedo 

On the SMASS taxonomic scheme, Mombasa is a Xc-type, an intermediate between the carbonaceous C and X-type, while it is also described as a darker P-type asteroid. According to the surveys carried out by the Infrared Astronomical Satellite IRAS, the Japanese Akari satellite, and NASA's Wide-field Infrared Survey Explorer with its subsequent NEOWISE mission, Mombasa measures between 52.46 and 62.45 kilometers in diameter, ignoring a preliminary result of 127 km, and its surface has an albedo of 0.025 and 0.06. The Collaborative Asteroid Lightcurve Link derives an albedo of 0.0415 and a diameter of 56.83 kilometers with an absolute magnitude of 10.3.

Naming 

This minor planet was named after Mombasa, chief-port and second largest city of Kenya on the coast of East Africa. The official  was published by the Minor Planet Center in April 1953.

Notes

References

External links 
 Asteroid Lightcurve Database (LCDB), query form (info )
 Dictionary of Minor Planet Names, Google books
 Asteroids and comets rotation curves, CdR – Observatoire de Genève, Raoul Behrend
 Discovery Circumstances: Numbered Minor Planets (1)-(5000) – Minor Planet Center
 
 

001428
Discoveries by Cyril Jackson (astronomer)
Named minor planets
001428
19370705